Jacobson is an English language patronymic surname meaning "son of Jacob".  The prefix is an Ashkenazic variation of the Latin Jacobus, itself derived from the Hebrew language given name Yaakov ("supplanter" or "follower"). The suffix, -son denotes "son/descendant of".  There are several variants.  The earliest record of the surname is found in Cambridgeshire in 1273.

People with the surname Jacobson include:

 Abbi Jacobson (born 1984), American comedian, actress and writer
Amy Jacobson (born 1969), television reporter for WMAQ News in Chicago
 Andrew Jacobson (born 1985), Major League Soccer player
 Arthur Jacobson (1901–1993), American assistant director
 Ben Jacobson (born 1970), American college basketball coach
 Bill Jacobson (born 1955), American photographer
 Brandon Jacobson (born 2003), American chess player
 Cecil Jacobson (1936–2021), disgraced American fertility doctor
 Clayton Jacobson II (born 1933), credited with inventing the personal water craft
 Dan Jacobson (1929–2014), South African writer
 Dana Jacobson (born 1971), American news anchor
 David Jacobson (diplomat) (born 1951), lawyer and former United States Ambassador to Canada
 Douglas T. Jacobson (1925–2000), US Marine who was awarded the Medal of Honor
 Edmund Jacobson, American physician, creator of the Jacobson's Progressive Muscle Relaxation technique 
 Edward Jacobson (1891–1955), Jewish American businessman and activist
 Edith Jacobson (1897–1978), German psychoanalyst
 Emily Jacobson (born 1985), American sabre fencer
 Eric Jacobson (born 1970), American puppeteer
 Ethel Jacobson (1899–1991), American poet
 Ethel Jacobson (editor) (1877–1965), New Zealand journalist and editor
 Freddie Jacobson (born 1974), Swedish golfer
 Georgiy Jacobson (1871–1926), Russian entomologist
 Harvey Jacobson (born 1956), British businessman
 Howard Jacobson (born 1942), British author
 Israel Jacobson (1768–1828), German philanthropist and reformer
 Ivar Jacobson (born 1939), Swedish computer scientist
 Jacob F. Jacobson (1849–1938), American businessman and politician
 Jeff Jacobson (Ohio), American politician, Ohio Republican state senator
 Joe Jacobson (born 1986), Welsh footballer
 Joel Jacobson (born 1951), American curler
 John G. Jacobson (1869–1929), American businessman and politician
 Joseph Jacobson, American inventor
 Judy Jacobson (1939–2019), American politician
 Leonard Jacobson (1921–1992), American museum architect
 Ludwig Lewin Jacobson (1783–1843), Danish surgeon
 Jacobson's cartilage
 Jacobson’s nerve
 Jacobson's organ
 Marcey Jacobson (1911–2009), American photographer
 Mark Z. Jacobson (born 1965), professor of civil and environmental engineering
 Nathan Jacobson (1910–1999), American mathematician
Jacobson's conjecture
Jacobson density theorem
Jacobson radical
Jacobson ring
 Norm Jacobson, rugby league footballer
 Oscar Jacobson (1882–1966), Swedish-born American painter and museum curator
 Peter Marc Jacobson, American television writer, director and producer
 Peter Jacobson, American film and television actor
 Peter Jacobson (judge), Federal Court of Australia judge
 Richard Jacobson (1923–2000), birth name of American actor Rick Jason
 Richard Jacobson (born 1959), Canadian artist
 Robert Jacobson (born 1940), former Lutheran Bishop who became a Catholic priest
 Robert M. Jacobson (born 1958), American physician
 Roman Jakobson or Jacobson (1896–1982), Russian linguist
 Sada Jacobson (born 1983), American sabre fencer
 Sam Jacobson (born 1975), American basketball player
 Sydney Jacobson (1908–1988), British journalist and editor
 Van Jacobson, American scientist and network specialist
 William Jacobson (1803–1884), British Anglican bishop
 William A. Jacobson, American attorney, Cornell Law School professor, and blogger
 Zach Jacobson (born 1984), American curler

See also
 Jakobson (surname)
 Jakobsson
 Jacobsen (surname)

References

Patronymic surnames
English-language surnames
Swedish-language surnames
Norwegian-language surnames
Jewish surnames